George Krieger Kittle (born October 9, 1993) is an American football tight end for the San Francisco 49ers of the National Football League (NFL). He played college football at Iowa, and was drafted by the 49ers in the fifth round of the 2017 NFL Draft. He is a four-time Pro Bowler and was a First-team All-Pro in 2019.

Early years
Kittle was born in Madison, Wisconsin and moved to Iowa at a young age. He attended Iowa City West High School in Iowa City, Iowa; Cedar Falls High School in Cedar Falls, Iowa; and Norman High School in Norman, Oklahoma. He committed to the University of Iowa to play college football. His father, Bruce Kittle, also played at Iowa and is a former college football coach.

College career
Kittle played at Iowa from 2012 to 2016 under head coach Kirk Ferentz. As a freshman, Kittle had a limited role behind senior C. J. Fiedorowicz, junior Ray Hamilton, and sophomore Jake Duzey. He had his first collegiate reception, which went for 47 yards, against the Missouri State Bears. Overall, he caught five passes for 108 yards.

Iowa's tight end unit remained crowded for Kittle in the 2014 season. Along with the return of Hamilton and Duzey, junior Henry Krieger-Coble added to the depth. Kittle had a lone reception for 25 yards against Maryland as his only catch of the season.

Kittle's role expanded in the 2015 season. On September 26, 2015, against North Texas, he scored his first collegiate touchdown on a 43-yard reception from quarterback C. J. Beathard. Overall, Kittle had 20 receptions for 290 receiving yards and six receiving touchdowns in the 2015 season. His six receiving touchdowns ranked sixth in the Big Ten Conference.

As a senior in the 2016 season, Kittle headlined a tight end unit that contained junior Peter Pekar and freshman Noah Fant. He had his best statistical game against North Dakota State with five receptions for 110 receiving yards. In his senior season, he had 22 receptions for 314 receiving yards and four receiving touchdowns. During his collegiate career, Kittle had 48 receptions for 737 yards and 10 touchdowns.

College statistics

Professional career
As  a top tight end prospect, Kittle was one of 19 collegiate tight ends to receive an invitation to the NFL Scouting Combine in Indianapolis, Indiana. He completed the majority of drills, but opted to skip the short shuttle and three-cone drill. Kittle's overall performance was well received, as he finished third among tight ends in the broad jump, fifth in the 40-yard dash, and finished sixth among his position group in the vertical jump. On March 27, 2017, Kittle participated at Iowa's Pro Day, along with C. J. Beathard, Desmond King, Jaleel Johnson, Greg Mabin, Riley McCarron, and four other prospects. He completed his combine drills, finishing the short shuttle (4.55s), three-cone drill, and also ran positional drills. Scouts and team representatives from all 32 NFL teams attended, including Cincinnati Bengals' tight end coach Jonathan Hayes. At the conclusion of the pre-draft process, Kittle was projected to be a third or fourth round pick by NFL draft experts and scouts. He was ranked the fifth best tight end prospect in the draft by NFL analyst Mike Mayock, sixth best by NFL analyst Gil Brandt, and was ranked the eighth best tight end by NFLDraftScout.com.

The San Francisco 49ers selected Kittle in the fifth round with the 146th overall pick in the 2017 NFL Draft. He was reunited with Iowa teammate C. J. Beathard, whom the San Francisco 49ers drafted in the third round (104th overall).

2017 season
On May 4, 2017, the San Francisco 49ers signed Kittle to a four-year, $2.69 million contract that included a signing bonus of $298,287.

Throughout training camp, he competed against Garrett Celek, Vance McDonald, Logan Paulsen, Blake Bell, and Cole Hikutini for the job as the starting tight end. Head coach Kyle Shanahan named Kittle the starting tight end to start the regular season.

Kittle made his NFL debut in the 49ers' season-opener against the Carolina Panthers and caught five passes for 27 yards in a 23–3 loss. He caught his first NFL reception on a 13-yard pass from Brian Hoyer on the first drive and was tackled by Panthers' safety Mike Adams.  On October 8, 2017, Kittle made seven receptions for 83 yards and his first NFL touchdown during a 26–23 overtime loss to the Indianapolis Colts. During a Week 9 matchup against the Arizona Cardinals, Kittle caught three passes for 27 yards, before leaving the 20–10 loss with a leg injury. He was inactive due to the injury and missed the following game against the New York Giants. He finished the regular season with his first 100-yard receiving game in Week 17 against the Los Angeles Rams.

Kittle finished his rookie season with 43 receptions for 515 yards and two touchdowns in 15 games.

2018 season
In the season opener against the Minnesota Vikings, Kittle had five receptions for 90 yards in a 24–16 loss. During Week 4 against the Los Angeles Chargers, Kittle recorded an 82-yard touchdown reception as part of a 125-yard performance as the 49ers narrowly lost by a score of 29–27. During Week 7 against the Los Angeles Rams, he had five receptions for 98 yards and a touchdown in the 39–10 loss. During Week 14 against the Denver Broncos, Kittle set a franchise record for receiving yards by a tight end with 210, all coming in the first half, as well as becoming the first 49ers tight end to surpass 1,000 receiving yards. During the season finale against the Rams, Kittle broke Travis Kelce's single-season receiving yards record for a tight end, less than an hour after Kelce broke the record, on a 43-yard touchdown and finished the season with 1,377 yards. The record was again broken by Kelce in 2020. He was named as a Pro Bowler for the first time. He was ranked 29th by his fellow players on the NFL Top 100 Players of 2019.

2019 season

Through the first four weeks of 2019 NFL season, during which the 49ers played the Tampa Bay Buccaneers, Cincinnati Bengals, and Pittsburgh Steelers, Kittle earned the highest overall Pro Football Focus grade of any player in the NFL. After a Week 4 bye, the 49ers faced the Cleveland Browns. In that game, Kittle had six receptions for 70 yards and his first touchdown of the season in the 31–3 victory. In the next game against the Los Angeles Rams, he caught eight passes for 103 yards in the 20–7 road victory. Three weeks later against the Arizona Cardinals, Kittle suffered a knee injury on the first play of the game and was forced to miss the next few plays. He returned to the game and caught six passes for 79 yards and a touchdown in the 28–25 road victory. However, he was forced to miss the next two games due to the injury. He returned in Week 12 against the Green Bay Packers. In the game, Kittle caught six passes for 129 yards and a touchdown in the 37–8 victory. Facing the New Orleans Saints in Week 14, he made a crucial 4th and 2 catch that went for 39 yards-17 of which he made while being face-masked by Saints cornerback Marcus Williams while carrying two other defenders. The catch set up the game-winning field goal. The 49ers won 48–46. During Week 15 against the Atlanta Falcons, Kittle finished with 13 catches for 134 yards as the 49ers lost 22–29. Following the loss, he was named to his second Pro Bowl with over 340,000 votes. Kittle was named as a First Team All-Pro for his 2019 season.

In Super Bowl LIV against the Kansas City Chiefs, Kittle caught four passes for 36 yards during the 31–20 loss. He was ranked 7th by his fellow players on the NFL Top 100 Players of 2020.

2020 season
On August 13, Kittle signed a five-year, $75 million contract with the 49ers with an $18 million signing bonus, making him the highest-paid tight end in the league. After missing two games due to a knee injury, Kittle returned in Week 4 against the Philadelphia Eagles on Sunday Night Football, finishing with 183 receiving yards and a touchdown as the 49ers lost 20–25.  In Week 6 against the Los Angeles Rams, he had seven receptions for 109 receiving yards and one touchdown in the 24-16 victory. On November 5, 2020, Kittle was placed on injured reserve with a broken bone in his foot. He was activated on December 25, 2020. In an injury-riddled season, Kittle finished with 48 receptions for 634 receiving yards and two touchdowns in eight games. He was ranked 50th by his fellow players on the NFL Top 100 Players of 2021.

2021 season
On October 9, 2021, Kittle was placed on injured reserve with a calf injury. He was activated on November 6. On November 8, in his return game, Kittle caught six passes for 101 yards and a touchdown in a loss to the Arizona Cardinals. In Week 13, he had nine receptions for 181 yards and two touchdowns in a 30–23 loss to the Seattle Seahawks. In Week 14, he had 13 receptions for 151 yards and one touchdown in a 26–23 win over the Cincinnati Bengals, earning NFC Offensive Player of the Week. Overall, Kittle finished the 2021 season with 71 receptions for 910 receiving yards and six touchdowns in 14 games. He earned his third career Pro Bowl nomination.

Kittle had seven catches for 108 yards during the 2021 postseason, receiving his first career postseason touchdown in the 49ers' 20–17 loss to the Los Angeles Rams in the NFC Championship. He was ranked 22nd by his fellow players on the NFL Top 100 Players of 2022.

2022 season
In the 2022 season, Kittle set a career high touchdown record with eleven touchdowns despite missing the first two weeks of the season with a groin injury. The 2022 season saw the 49ers rotate through three starting Quarterbacks after a variety of injuries. With the 49ers' 3rd Quarterback Brock Purdy, Kittle seemed to really connect regularly, with back to back weeks with two receiving touchdowns in Week 15 and 16 against the Seattle Seahawks and Washington Commanders  respectively. Kittle also received his 4th Pro Bowl nomination in 2022.

NFL career statistics

NFL records

Regular season
Most receiving yards in a half by a tight end: 210
 First tight end to lead the league in yards after catch: 870
 Most receiving yards in first three seasons by a tight end: 2,945
 First tight end to achieve at least 150 receiving yards and one touchdown in two consecutive games

49ers franchise records
 Most receiving yards in a game by a tight end: 210
 Most receptions in a season by a tight end: 88
 First tight end to surpass 1,000 receiving yards

Personal life
Kittle married Claire (née Till) on April 9, 2019. The couple met at the University of Iowa, where Claire played basketball. Kittle has stated that he has been an avid fan of the Chicago Bears since childhood.

References

External links
 
Twitter
San Francisco 49ers bio
Iowa Hawkeyes bio

1993 births
Living people
American football tight ends
Iowa Hawkeyes football players
Players of American football from Oklahoma
Players of American football from Wisconsin
San Francisco 49ers players
Sportspeople from Madison, Wisconsin
Sportspeople from Norman, Oklahoma
Iowa City West High School alumni
National Conference Pro Bowl players